John Francis Carroll (1932 – August 8, 1969) was one of 23 known people in medical history to have reached a height of  or more. He suffered from severe, 2-dimensional spinal curvature (Kyphoscoliosis) and acromegalic gigantism.

Carroll was born in Buffalo, New York and was known as the Buffalo Giant in medical literature. He was third in stature only to Robert Wadlow and John Rogan. His extraordinary growth started at the age of sixteen. During his life his growth continued despite extensive treatments. At one point he grew  in height in one year.

He died on August 8, 1969 and was buried in Holy Cross Cemetery in Lackawanna, New York.

See also
List of tallest people
Robert Wadlow
John Rogan
Gigantism

References

1932 births
1969 deaths
Burials in New York (state)
People from Buffalo, New York
People with gigantism